Chanderiya railway station is a railway station in Chittaurgarh district, Rajasthan. Its code is CNA. The station consists of 3 platforms. Passenger, Express, and Superfast trains halt here.

References

Railway stations in Chittorgarh district
Ratlam railway division